David Caldwell (born June 13, 1974) is a former professional tennis player from the United States.

Career
Caldwell was a three time All-American while at the University of North Carolina. He and Paul Goldstein were doubles gold medalists at the 1995 Summer Universiade, held in Fukuoka.

He lost to Petr Korda in the opening round of the 1996 US Open and also exited in the first round of men's doubles, partnering Cecil Mamiit.

His next Grand Slam appearance was in the 1997 Australian Open, where he again failed to make the second round, losing to Arnaud Boetsch.

Caldwell had wins over Kenneth Carlsen and Ramon Delgado to reach the round of 16 at Washington in 1998.
 
He was beaten by Fabrice Santoro in first round of the 1999 Australian Open.

References

1974 births
Living people
American male tennis players
Tennis people from Virginia
Universiade medalists in tennis
Universiade gold medalists for the United States
Medalists at the 1995 Summer Universiade
North Carolina Tar Heels men's tennis players
20th-century American people